Raymond Myland (30 July 1927 – 12 January 2014) was an English wrestler who competed for Great Britain and England.

Wrestling career
He represented Great Britain in the 1948 Summer Olympics and in the 1952 Summer Olympics.

He represented England and won a bronze medal in the -74 kg division at the 1954 British Empire and Commonwealth Games in Vancouver, Canada.

Four years later he won another bronze at the 1958 British Empire and Commonwealth Games in Cardiff in the -82 kg division.

References

External links
 

1927 births
2014 deaths
British male sport wrestlers
Olympic wrestlers of Great Britain
Wrestlers at the 1948 Summer Olympics
Wrestlers at the 1952 Summer Olympics
Wrestlers at the 1954 British Empire and Commonwealth Games
Wrestlers at the 1958 British Empire and Commonwealth Games
Commonwealth Games medallists in wrestling
Commonwealth Games bronze medallists for England
Medallists at the 1954 British Empire and Commonwealth Games
Medallists at the 1958 British Empire and Commonwealth Games